James Gabriel Montresor (19 November 1704 – 6 January 1776) was a British military engineer.

Early life and the western Mediterranean
Montresor was born on Broad Street or St. James's, Westminster, 19 November 1704, the son of James Gabriel le Trésor and Nanon de Hauteville. His father, who belonged to a Huguenot refugee family, joined the British service and was naturalized, taking the name of Montresor. He would later become Lieutenant Governor of Fort William where he died 22 January 1723/4.

Joining the Royal Artillery, Montresor is said to have been present at the 1727 siege of Gibraltar, but more credible accounts place him in Menorca, as a matross. He was later a bombardier at Gibraltar, and was there commissioned as an engineer in 1731. He continued to serve at Gibraltar, with a brief interlude in Menorca, until in 1747 he was named chief engineer of Gibraltar. He had also held a commission as Lieutenant in the 14th Regiment of Foot since 23 July 1737.

America
In 1754, he was appointed chief engineer for General Braddock and went to America with the troops. He is frequently said to have been present at the defeat of Braddock's expedition in 1755, but this appears to confuse him with his son John Montresor, who was wounded in the battle (some accounts suggest illness prevented the father's presence). He spent most of the remainder of the French and Indian War in and around Albany, where his activities included the design and construction of numerous military fortifications, including a new fort on the site previously occupied by Fort William Henry, named Fort George. Montresor was promoted to Director and Lieutenant Colonel, Royal Engineers, 4 Jan. 1758.

Return to Britain
By 1760, he had risen to the role of Chief Engineer in the Provinces, and in recognition of his efforts in New York he was granted 10,000 acres (40 km2) of land on the eastern (Vermont) side of Lake Champlain. However, in that year ill health forced his return to England, followed by the resignation of his commission in the 14th Foot in 1762. He would later construct powder magazines at Purfleet, and was chief engineer at Chatham. Throughout his career, he also drafted numerous maps and plans of the areas around which he was stationed, and kept journals, which have been published.

James Gabriel Montresor married first, 11 June 1735, Mary Haswell, daughter of Robert Haswell, Master Attendant of the royal dockyard at Gibraltar. By her he had two daughters and five sons, most notable among these being John Montresor. Mary died 5 March 1761. He remarried 25 August 1766, Henrietta Fielding, daughter of novelist Henry Fielding who was already "in deep decline", and died months later, 11 December 1766. Montresor married as his third wife Frances Nickolls, daughter of H. Nickolls and widow of William Kemp. He died at Teynham, Kent, 6 January 1776.

Citations

References 
 Secretary at War (1756). A list of the officers on the British and Irish establishment. London. [cited as "Army List 1756"]
 Secretary at War (1767). A list of the officers on the British and Irish establishment. London. [cited as "Army List 1767"]
 Finigan, H., "The Montresor Papers"; microfilm collection of James & John M. personal papers; Copies located in 3 places David Library of the American Revolution; Special Collections Branch, USMA Library & Royal Engineers Library, Chatham, UK.
 Skull, G. D., The Montresor Journals, Collections of the New York Historical Society for the Year 1881.
 
 "James Gabriel Montrésor" Dictionary of American Biography XIII, 100–101.
 Montresor, Frank Montresor, "Memoirs of the Montresors", mss. 1941.
 Montresor pedigree, Proceedings of the Huguenot Society of London, 1917, facing p. 293, along with "Notes and Jottings in connection with the Montresor Pedigree", ibid, pp. 293–300.
 Dobson, Austin, Fielding, 2004, Kessinger Publishing, 138.

1704 births
1776 deaths
People from Westminster
British military personnel of the French and Indian War
West Yorkshire Regiment officers
Royal Artillery soldiers
Royal Engineers officers
18th-century British engineers
18th-century British Army personnel